AJD is a three-letter acronym. It can refer to:

Accelerated JD program
Astronomical Julian day
All Japan Districts, one of the awards issued by the Japan Amateur Radio League